The Roman Catholic Diocese of Ilagan (Lat: Dioecesis Ilaganensis) is a diocese of the Latin Church of the Catholic Church in the Philippines.  It was erected on 31 January 1970 from territory of the then Roman Catholic Diocese of Tuguegarao and it covers the entire civil Province of Isabela.  It is a suffragan diocese of the Roman Catholic Archdiocese of Tuguegarao.

The diocese has had no jurisdictional changes. The seat of the diocese used to be located in Saint Ferdinand Parish Church in Ilagan City before being transferred to the Gamu Cathedral (Cathedral of Saint Michael the Archangel) in Gamu, Isabela, in 2013.

David William V. Antonio, S.Th.D., D.D. was installed as the fifth Bishop of Ilagan on February 12, 2019.

Ordinaries

See also
Catholic Church in the Philippines
List of Catholic dioceses in the Philippines

References

Ilagan
Ilagan
Religion in Isabela (province)
Ilagan